Triammatus tristis is a species of beetle in the family Cerambycidae. It was described by Francis Polkinghorne Pascoe in 1860. It is known from Borneo and Moluccas.

Subspecies
 Triammatus tristis tristis Pascoe, 1860
 Triammatus tristis juheli Jiroux, Garreau, Bentanachs & Prévost, 2016

References

Lamiini
Beetles described in 1860